The Theo Thijssen-prijs (Dutch for Theo Thijssen Prize) is a Dutch literary award awarded once every three years to a Dutch author of children's literature or young adult fiction. The award is not given for a particular work, but for the entire oeuvre. The award is named after Dutch writer, teacher and socialist politician Theo Thijssen. 

The Theo Thijssen-prijs is a continuation of the literary award Staatsprijs voor kinder-en jeugdliteratuur (Dutch for State prize for children's and youth literature) which was first awarded in 1964. The award ceremony is held in the Dutch Museum of Literature in The Hague. The award is awarded by the Stichting P.C. Hooft-prijs voor Letterkunde.

Winners

Staatsprijs voor kinder- en jeugdliteratuur 

 1964: Annie M. G. Schmidt
 1967: An Rutgers van der Loeff-Basenau
 1970: Miep Diekmann
 1973: Paul Biegel
 1976: Tonke Dragt
 1979: Guus Kuijer
 1982: Henk Barnard
 1985: Not awarded

Theo Thijssen-prijs 

 1988: Willem Wilmink
 1991: Wim Hofman
 1994: Els Pelgrom
 1997: Toon Tellegen
 2000: Joke van Leeuwen
 2003: Imme Dros
 2006: Peter van Gestel
 2009: Ted van Lieshout
 2012: Sjoerd Kuyper
 2015: Martha Heesen
 2018: Bibi Dumon Tak
 2021: Daan Remmerts de Vries

Notes

References

External links 
 

Dutch literary awards
Children's literary awards
Dutch children's literature
Awards established in 1988
1988 establishments in the Netherlands
Literary awards honoring lifetime achievement